The Fox River is a tributary of the Little Wabash River in southern Illinois. It rises in Jasper County to the southeast of Newton and flows south past Olney, then joins the Little Wabash at the northeast corner of Edwards County, near Mt. Erie.

There is a smaller "Fox River" that is a tributary of the Wabash River in southern Illinois, entering the Wabash near New Harmony, Indiana.

Cities, towns and counties
The following cities, towns and villages are in the Fox River watershed:
Olney

The following counties are at least partially drained by the Fox River:
Edwards
Jasper
Richland
Wayne

Lakes and recreational areas
East Fork Lake
Olney Lake
Richland County Public Hunting Area

See also
List of Illinois rivers

References

External links
Prairie Rivers Network
TopoQuest, Fox and Little Wabash Rivers

Rivers of Illinois
Rivers of Jasper County, Illinois
Rivers of Edwards County, Illinois
Rivers of Richland County, Illinois
Rivers of Wayne County, Illinois